Solanales is an order of flowering plants, included in the asterid group of dicotyledons. The anthophytes are a grouping of plant taxa bearing flower-like reproductive structures. They were formerly thought to be a clade comprising plants bearing flower-like structures.  The group contained the angiosperms - the extant flowering plants, such as roses and grasses - as well as the Gnetales and the extinct Bennettitales.

23,420 species of vascular plant have been recorded in South Africa, making it the sixth most species-rich country in the world and the most species-rich country on the African continent. Of these, 153 species are considered to be threatened. Nine biomes have been described in South Africa: Fynbos, Succulent Karoo, desert, Nama Karoo, grassland, savanna, Albany thickets, the Indian Ocean coastal belt, and forests.

The 2018 South African National Biodiversity Institute's National Biodiversity Assessment plant checklist lists 35,130 taxa in the phyla Anthocerotophyta (hornworts (6)), Anthophyta (flowering plants (33534)), Bryophyta (mosses (685)), Cycadophyta (cycads (42)), Lycopodiophyta (Lycophytes(45)), Marchantiophyta (liverworts (376)), Pinophyta (conifers (33)), and Pteridophyta (cryptogams (408)).

Four families are represented in the literature. Listed taxa include species, subspecies, varieties, and forms as recorded, some of which have subsequently been allocated to other taxa as synonyms, in which cases the accepted taxon is appended to the listing. Multiple entries under alternative names reflect taxonomic revision over time.

Convolvulaceae
 Family: Convolvulaceae,

Astripomoea
Genus Astripomoea:
 Astripomoea malvacea (Klotzsch) A.Meeuse, indigenous
 Astripomoea malvacea (Klotzsch) A.Meeuse var. malvacea, indigenous
 Astrochlaena rotundata Pilg. accepted as Astripomoea rotundata (Pilg.) A.Meeuse

Bonamia
Genus Bonamia:
 Bonamia schizantha (Hallier f.) A.Meeuse, accepted as Seddera schizantha Hallier f. 
 Bonamia velutina Verdc. indigenous

Calystegia
Genus Calystegia:
 Calystegia sepium (L.) R.Br. not indigenous, naturalised
 Calystegia soldanella (L.) R.Br. ex Roem. & Schult. not indigenous, naturalised

Convolvulus
Genus Convolvulus:
 Convolvulus arvensis L. not indigenous, naturalised, invasive
 Convolvulus aschersonii Engl. indigenous
 Convolvulus bidentatus Bernh. ex C.Krauss, endemic
 Convolvulus boedeckerianus Peter, endemic
 Convolvulus capensis Burm.f. endemic
 Convolvulus capensis Burm.f. var. bowieanus (Rendle) A.Meeuse, accepted as Convolvulus capensis Burm.f. present
 Convolvulus capensis Burm.f. var. plicatus (Desr.) Baker, accepted as Convolvulus capensis Burm.f. present
 Convolvulus dregeanus Choisy, endemic
 Convolvulus farinosus L. indigenous
 Convolvulus galpinii C.H.Wright, endemic
 Convolvulus indicus Burm.f. accepted as Ipomoea indica (Burm.f.) Merr. present
 Convolvulus malabaricus L. accepted as Hewittia malabarica (L.) Suresh, present
 Convolvulus multifidus Thunb. endemic
 Convolvulus natalensis Bernh. ex Krauss, indigenous
 Convolvulus natalensis Bernh. ex Krauss var. transvaalensis (Schltr.) A.Meeuse, accepted as Convolvulus natalensis Bernh. ex Krauss, present
 Convolvulus ocellatus Hook.f. indigenous
 Convolvulus ocellatus Hook.f. var. ocellatus, indigenous
 Convolvulus ocellatus Hook.f. var. ornatus (Engl.) A.Meeuse, accepted as Convolvulus ocellatus Hook.f. var. ocellatus, present
 Convolvulus sagittatus Thunb. indigenous
 Convolvulus sagittatus Thunb. subsp. grandiflorus (Hallier f.) A.Meeuse var. graminifolius, accepted as Convolvulus sagittatus Thunb. present
 Convolvulus sagittatus Thunb. subsp. grandiflorus (Hallier f.) A.Meeuse var. grandiflorus, accepted as Convolvulus sagittatus Thunb. 
 Convolvulus sagittatus Thunb. subsp. grandiflorus (Hallier f.) A.Meeuse var. linearifolius, accepted as Convolvulus sagittatus Thunb. present
 Convolvulus sagittatus Thunb. subsp. sagittatus var. hirtellus, accepted as Convolvulus sagittatus Thunb. present
 Convolvulus sagittatus Thunb. subsp. sagittatus var. namaquensis, accepted as Convolvulus sagittatus Thunb. present
 Convolvulus sagittatus Thunb. subsp. sagittatus var. phyllosepalus, accepted as Convolvulus sagittatus Thunb. present
 Convolvulus sagittatus Thunb. subsp. sagittatus var. ulosepalus, accepted as Convolvulus sagittatus Thunb. present
 Convolvulus sagittatus Thunb. var. aschersonii (Engl.) Verdc. accepted as Convolvulus aschersonii Engl. present
 Convolvulus sublobatus L.f. accepted as Hewittia malabarica (L.) Suresh, present
 Convolvulus thunbergii Roem. & Schult. indigenous

Cuscuta
Genus Cuscuta:
 Cuscuta africana Willd. endemic
 Cuscuta angulata Engelm. endemic
 Cuscuta appendiculata Engelm. endemic
 Cuscuta australis R.Br. indigenous
 Cuscuta bifurcata Yunck. endemic
 Cuscuta campestris Yunck. not indigenous, naturalised, invasive
 Cuscuta cassytoides Engelm. indigenous
 Cuscuta epithymum Murray, not indigenous, naturalised
 Cuscuta gerrardii Baker, endemic
 Cuscuta hyalina Roth, indigenous
 Cuscuta kilimanjari Oliv. indigenous
 Cuscuta kilimanjari Oliv. var. kilimanjari, indigenous
 Cuscuta natalensis Baker, endemic
 Cuscuta nitida Choisy, endemic
 Cuscuta planiflora Ten. indigenous
 Cuscuta planiflora Ten. var.  madagascarensis (Yunck.) Verdc. indigenous
 Cuscuta planiflora Ten. var.  planiflora, indigenous
 Cuscuta suaveolens Ser. not indigenous, naturalised, invasive

Dichondra
Genus Dichondra:
 Dichondra micrantha Urb. not indigenous, naturalised

Evolvulus 
Genus Evolvulus :
 Evolvulus alsinoides (L.) L. indigenous
 Evolvulus alsinoides (L.) L. var.  linifolius (L.) Baker, accepted as Evolvulus alsinoides (L.) L. present
 Evolvulus nummularius (L.) L. indigenous

Falkia
Genus Falkia:
 Falkia oblonga Bernh. ex C.Krauss, indigenous
 Falkia repens Thunb. endemic

Hewittia
Genus Hewittia:
 Hewittia malabarica (L.) Suresh, indigenous
 Hewittia sublobata (L.f.) Kuntze, accepted as Hewittia malabarica (L.) Suresh, present

Ipomoea
Genus Ipomoea:
 Ipomoea adenioides Schinz, indigenous
 Ipomoea adenioides Schinz var.  adenioides, indigenous
 Ipomoea alba L. not indigenous, naturalised, invasive
 Ipomoea albivenia (Lindl.) Sweet, indigenous
 Ipomoea aquatica Forssk. indigenous
 Ipomoea arachnosperma Welw. accepted as Ipomoea dichroa Choisy, present
 Ipomoea atherstonei Baker, accepted as Ipomoea oblongata E.Mey. ex Choisy, present
 Ipomoea bathycolpos Hallier f. endemic
 Ipomoea bathycolpos Hallier f. var. sinuatodentata Hallier f. accepted as Ipomoea bathycolpos Hallier f. present
 Ipomoea bisavium A.Meeuse, endemic
 Ipomoea bolusiana Schinz, indigenous
 Ipomoea bolusiana Schinz var. pinnatipartita Verdc. accepted as Ipomoea bolusiana Schinz, present
 Ipomoea cairica (L.) Sweet, indigenous
 Ipomoea cairica (L.) Sweet var.  cairica, indigenous
 Ipomoea carnea Jacq. subsp. fistulosa (Mart. ex Choisy) D.F.Austin, not indigenous, naturalised, invasive
 Ipomoea chloroneura Hallier f. indigenous
 Ipomoea congesta R.Br. accepted as Ipomoea indica (Burm.f.) Merr. present
 Ipomoea consimilis Schulze-Menz, indigenous
 Ipomoea coptica (L.) Roth ex Roem. & Schult. indigenous
 Ipomoea coscinosperma Hochst. ex Choisy, indigenous
 Ipomoea crassipes Hook. indigenous
 Ipomoea crassipes Hook. var. crassipes, indigenous
 Ipomoea crispa (Thunb.) Hallier f. endemic
 Ipomoea dichroa Choisy, indigenous
 Ipomoea eriocarpa R.Br. indigenous
 Ipomoea ficifolia Lindl. indigenous
 Ipomoea fistulosa Mart. ex Choisy, accepted as Ipomoea carnea Jacq. subsp. fistulosa (Mart. ex Choisy) D.F.Austin, not indigenous, naturalised
 Ipomoea gracilisepala Rendle, indigenous
 Ipomoea hackeliana (Schinz) Hallier f. indigenous
 Ipomoea hederifolia L. not indigenous, cultivated, naturalised, invasive
 Ipomoea hochstetteri House, indigenous
 Ipomoea holubii Baker, indigenous
 Ipomoea indica (Burm.f.) Merr. not indigenous, naturalised, invasive
 Ipomoea involucrata P.Beauv. indigenous
 Ipomoea involucrata P.Beauv. var. involucrata, indigenous
 Ipomoea lapathifolia Hallier f. indigenous
 Ipomoea lapathifolia Hallier f. var. lapathifolia, indigenous
 Ipomoea magnusiana Schinz, indigenous
 Ipomoea magnusiana Schinz var. eenii (Rendle) A.Meeuse, accepted as Ipomoea magnusiana Schinz, present
 Ipomoea mauritiana Jacq. indigenous
 Ipomoea nil (L.) Roth, not indigenous, naturalised
 Ipomoea oblongata E.Mey. ex Choisy, indigenous
 Ipomoea obscura (L.) Ker Gawl. indigenous
 Ipomoea obscura (L.) Ker Gawl. var. fragilis (Choisy) A.Meeuse, accepted as Ipomoea obscura (L.) Ker Gawl. var. obscura, present
 Ipomoea obscura (L.) Ker Gawl. var. obscura, indigenous
 Ipomoea oenotherae (Vatke) Hallier f. indigenous
 Ipomoea oenotherae (Vatke) Hallier f. var. oenotherae, indigenous
 Ipomoea oenotheroides (L.f.) Raf. ex Hallier f. indigenous
 Ipomoea ommanneyi Rendle, indigenous
 Ipomoea papilio Hallier f. indigenous
 Ipomoea pellita Hallier f. indigenous
 Ipomoea pes-caprae (L.) R.Br. indigenous
 Ipomoea pes-caprae (L.) R.Br. subsp. brasiliensis (L.) Ooststr. indigenous
 Ipomoea pes-tigridis L. indigenous
 Ipomoea pes-tigridis L. var. pes-tigridis, indigenous
 Ipomoea pileata Roxb. indigenous
 Ipomoea plebeia R.Br. indigenous
 Ipomoea plebeia R.Br. subsp. africana A.Meeuse, indigenous
 Ipomoea purpurea (L.) Roth, not indigenous, naturalised, invasive
 Ipomoea quinquefolia Hochst. ex Hallier f. var. purpurea Hallier f. accepted as Ipomoea hochstetteri House 
 Ipomoea robertsiana Rendle, endemic
 Ipomoea shirambensis Baker, indigenous
 Ipomoea simplex Thunb. indigenous
 Ipomoea sinensis (Desr.) Choisy, indigenous
 Ipomoea sinensis (Desr.) Choisy subsp. blepharosepala (Hochst. ex A.Rich.) Verdc. ex A.Meeuse, indigenous
 Ipomoea stenosiphon Hallier f. indigenous
 Ipomoea suffruticosa Burch. indigenous
 Ipomoea tenuipes Verdc. indigenous
 Ipomoea transvaalensis A.Meeuse, indigenous
 Ipomoea wightii (Wall.) Choisy, indigenous
 Ipomoea wightii (Wall.) Choisy var. wightii, indigenous
 Ipomoea woodii N.E.Br. accepted as Stictocardia laxiflora (Baker) Hallier f. present

Jacquemontia
Genus Jacquemontia:
 Jacquemontia tamnifolia (L.) Griseb. indigenous

Merremia
Genus Merremia:
 Merremia kentrocaulos (C.B.Clarke) Rendle, indigenous
 Merremia malvaefolia Rendle, endemic
 Merremia palmata Hallier f. indigenous
 Merremia pinnata (Hochst. ex Choisy) Hallier f. indigenous
 Merremia pterygocaulos (Choisy) Hallier f. indigenous
 Merremia tridentata (L.) Hallier f. subsp. angustifolia (Jacq.) Ooststr. var. angustifolia, accepted as Xenostegia tridentata (L.) D.F.Austin & Staples subsp. angustifolia (Jacq.) Lejoly & Lisowski, present
 Merremia verecunda Rendle, indigenous

Paralepistemon
Genus Paralepistemon:
 Paralepistemon shirensis (Oliv.) Lejoly & Lisowski, indigenous

Poranopsis
Genus Poranopsis:
 Poranopsis paniculata (Roxb.) Roberty, not indigenous, cultivated, naturalised

Seddera
Genus Seddera:
 Seddera capensis (E.Mey. ex Choisy) Hallier f. indigenous
 Seddera suffruticosa (Schinz) Hallier f. indigenous

Stictocardia
Genus Stictocardia:
 Stictocardia laxiflora (Baker) Hallier f. indigenous
 Stictocardia laxiflora (Baker) Hallier f. var. woodii (N.E.Br.) Verdc. accepted as Stictocardia laxiflora (Baker) Hallier f. present
 Stictocardia woodii (N.E.Br.) Hallier f. accepted as Stictocardia laxiflora (Baker) Hallier f. present

Turbina
Genus Turbina:
 Turbina holubii (Baker) A.Meeuse, accepted as Ipomoea holubii Baker, present
 Turbina oblongata (E.Mey. ex Choisy) A.Meeuse, accepted as Ipomoea oblongata E.Mey. ex Choisy, present
 Turbina oenotheroides (L.f.) A.Meeuse, accepted as Ipomoea oenotheroides (L.f.) Raf. ex Hallier f. present
 Turbina robertsiana (Rendle) A.Meeuse, accepted as Ipomoea robertsiana Rendle, present
 Turbina shirensis (Oliv.) A.Meeuse, accepted as Paralepistemon shirensis (Oliv.) Lejoly & Lisowski, present
 Turbina stenosiphon (Hallier f.) A.Meeuse, accepted as Ipomoea stenosiphon Hallier f. present
 Turbina suffruticosa (Burch.) A.Meeuse, accepted as Ipomoea suffruticosa Burch. present

Xenostegia
Genus Xenostegia:
 Xenostegia tridentata (L.) D.F.Austin & Staples, indigenous
 Xenostegia tridentata (L.) D.F.Austin & Staples subsp. angustifolia (Jacq.) Lejoly & Lisowski, indigenous

Montiniaceae
Family: Montiniaceae,

Montinia
Genus Montinia:
 Montinia caryophyllacea Thunb. indigenous

Solanaceae
Family: Solanaceae,

Atropa
Genus Atropa:
 Atropa solanacea L. accepted as Solanum guineense L. indigenous

Brugmansia
Genus Brugmansia:
 Brugmansia arborea (L.) Lagerh. not indigenous, cultivated, naturalised

Capsicum
Genus Capsicum:
 Capsicum annuum L. not indigenous, naturalised
 Capsicum annuum L. var. aviculare (Dierb.) D'Arcy & Eshbaugh, accepted as Capsicum annuum L. var. glabriusculum (Dunal) Heiser & Pickersgill, not indigenous, cultivated
 Capsicum annuum L. var. glabriusculum (Dunal) Heiser & Pickersgill, not indigenous, naturalised
 Capsicum frutescens L. not indigenous, naturalised
 Capsicum hispidum Dunal var. glabriusculum Dunal, accepted as Capsicum annuum L. var. glabriusculum (Dunal) Heiser & Pickersgill, unconfirmed
 Capsicum indicum Dierb. var. aviculare Dierb. accepted as Capsicum annuum L. var. glabriusculum (Dunal) Heiser & Pickersgill

Cestrum
Genus Cestrum:
 Cestrum aurantiacum Lindl. not indigenous, naturalised, invasive
 Cestrum elegans (Brongn.) Schltdl. not indigenous, naturalised, invasive
 Cestrum laevigatum Schltdl. not indigenous, naturalised, invasive
 Cestrum parqui L'Her. not indigenous, naturalised, invasive

Cyphomandra
Genus Cyphomandra:
 Cyphomandra betacea (Cav.) Sendtn. accepted as Solanum betaceum Cav. not indigenous, naturalised
 Cyphomandra sp. accepted as Solanum sp.

Datura
Genus Datura:
 Datura ferox L. not indigenous, naturalised, invasive
 Datura innoxia Mill. accepted as Datura innoxia Mill. not indigenous, naturalised, invasive
 Datura innoxia Mill. not indigenous, naturalised
 Datura metel L. not indigenous, naturalised
 Datura stramonium L. not indigenous, naturalised, invasive

Lycium
Genus Lycium:
 Lycium acutifolium E.Mey. ex Dunal, endemic
 Lycium afrum L. endemic
 Lycium amoenum Dammer, indigenous
 Lycium arenicola Miers, indigenous
 Lycium bosciifolium Schinz, indigenous
 Lycium cinereum Thunb. indigenous
 Lycium cordatum Mill. accepted as Carissa bispinosa (L.) Desf. ex Brenan, indigenous
 Lycium ferocissimum Miers, indigenous
 Lycium gariepense A.M.Venter, indigenous
 Lycium grandicalyx Joubert & Venter, indigenous
 Lycium hantamense A.M.Venter, indigenous
 Lycium hirsutum Dunal, indigenous
 Lycium horridum Thunb. indigenous
 Lycium mascarenense A.M.Venter & A.J.Scott, indigenous
 Lycium oxycarpum Dunal, endemic
 Lycium pilifolium C.H.Wright, indigenous
 Lycium prunus-spinosa Dunal, accepted as Lycium cinereum Thunb. present
 Lycium pumilum Dammer, indigenous
 Lycium schizocalyx C.H.Wright, indigenous
 Lycium shawii Roem. & Schult. indigenous
 Lycium strandveldense A.M.Venter, indigenous
 Lycium tenue Willd. endemic
 Lycium tetrandrum Thunb. indigenous
 Lycium villosum Schinz, indigenous

Nicandra
Genus Nicandra:
 Nicandra physalodes (L.) Gaertn. not indigenous, naturalised, invasive

Nicotiana
Genus Nicotiana:
 Nicotiana glauca Graham, not indigenous, naturalised, invasive
 Nicotiana longiflora Cav. not indigenous, naturalised
 Nicotiana tabacum L. not indigenous, naturalised

Nierembergia
Genus Nierembergia:
 Nierembergia hippomanica Miers var. glabriuscula Dunal, accepted as Nierembergia hippomanica Miers var. violacea Millan, cultivated
 Nierembergia hippomanica Miers var. violacea Millan, not indigenous, naturalised
 Nierembergia linariifolia Graham var. glabriuscula (Dunal) Cocucci & Hunz. accepted as Nierembergia hippomanica Miers var. violacea Millan, not indigenous, naturalised

Physalis
Genus Physalis:
 Physalis angulata L. not indigenous, naturalised, invasive
 Physalis minima L. not indigenous, naturalised
 Physalis peruviana L. not indigenous, cultivated, naturalised, invasive
 Physalis philadelphica Lam. not indigenous, naturalised
 Physalis viscosa L. not indigenous, naturalised, invasive

Salpichroa
Genus Salpichroa:
 Salpichroa origanifolia (Lam.) Baill. not indigenous, cultivated, naturalised

Solanum
Genus Solanum:
 Solanum acanthoideum Drege ex Dunal, accepted as Solanum dasyphyllum Schumach. & Thonn. indigenous
 Solanum aculeastrum Dunal, indigenous
 Solanum aculeatissimum Jacq. not indigenous, naturalised
 Solanum africanum Mill. endemic
 Solanum aggerum Dunal, accepted as Solanum africanum Mill. indigenous
 Solanum aggregatum Jacq. accepted as Solanum guineense L. indigenous
 Solanum aggregatum Jacq. var. bachmannii (Dammer) Bitter, accepted as Solanum guineense L. indigenous
 Solanum albotomentosum C.H.Wright, accepted as Solanum catombelense Peyr. 
 Solanum americanum Mill. not indigenous, naturalised, invasive
 Solanum anguivi Lam. indigenous
 Solanum aranoideum Dammer, accepted as Solanum supinum Dunal 
 Solanum auriculatum Aiton, accepted as Solanum mauritianum Scop. 
 Solanum bachmannii Dammer, accepted as Solanum guineense L. indigenous
 Solanum bansoense Dammer subsp. sanaganum Bitter, accepted as Solanum terminale Forssk. 
 Solanum betaceum Cav. not indigenous, naturalised, invasive
 Solanum bifurcatum Hochst. ex A.Rich. accepted as Solanum terminale Forssk. 
 Solanum bifurcum Hochst. ex Dunal, accepted as Solanum terminale Forssk. 
 Solanum bojeri Dunal, accepted as Solanum campylacanthum Hochst. ex A.Rich. 
 Solanum bracteatum Thunb. accepted as Solanum africanum Mill. indigenous
 Solanum burbankii Bitter, accepted as Solanum retroflexum Dunal, indigenous
 Solanum burchellii Dunal, indigenous
 Solanum campylacanthum Hochst. ex A.Rich. indigenous
 Solanum campylacanthum Hochst. ex A.Rich. subsp. panduriforme (Drege ex Dunal) J.Samuels, accepted as Solanum campylacanthum Hochst. ex A.Rich. indigenous
 Solanum capense L. indigenous
 Solanum capense L. subsp. quercilobum Bitter, accepted as Solanum capense L. 
 Solanum capense L. var. evectistellatum Bitter, accepted as Solanum capense L. indigenous
 Solanum capense L. var. sodomaeodes (Kuntze) Bitter, accepted as Solanum sodomaeodes Kuntze, indigenous
 Solanum capense L. var. tomentosum C.H.Wright, accepted as Solanum capense L. indigenous
 Solanum capense L. var. uniradiatum Bitter, accepted as Solanum sodomaeodes Kuntze, indigenous
 Solanum capense L. var. wilmsii (Dammer) Bitter, accepted as Solanum sodomaeodes Kuntze, indigenous
 Solanum capsicoides All. not indigenous, naturalised
 Solanum catombelense Peyr. indigenous
 Solanum chenopodioides Lam. not indigenous, naturalised, invasive
 Solanum chondropetalum Dammer, accepted as Solanum tettense Klotzsch 
 Solanum chrysotrichum Schltdl. not indigenous, naturalised, invasive
 Solanum ciliatum Lam. accepted as Solanum capsicoides All. not indigenous
 Solanum coccineum Jacq. accepted as Solanum tomentosum L. indigenous
 Solanum crassifolium Lam. accepted as Solanum africanum Mill. indigenous
 Solanum damarense Bitter, accepted as Solanum humile Lam. 
 Solanum dasyphyllum Schumach. & Thonn. indigenous
 Solanum dasyphyllum Schumach. & Thonn. var. natalense Bitter, accepted as Solanum dasyphyllum Schumach. & Thonn. indigenous
 Solanum dasypodum St.-Lag. accepted as Solanum guineense L. indigenous
 Solanum dasypus Drege ex Dunal, accepted as Solanum guineense L. indigenous
 Solanum dasypus E.Mey. accepted as Solanum guineense L. indigenous
 Solanum delagoense Dunal, accepted as Solanum campylacanthum Hochst. ex A.Rich. indigenous
 Solanum delagoense Dunal subsp. transvaalense Bitter, accepted as Solanum campylacanthum Hochst. ex A.Rich. indigenous
 Solanum denudatum Bitter, accepted as Solanum humile Lam. 
 Solanum didymanthum Dunal, accepted as Solanum rubetorum Dunal, indigenous
 Solanum didymanthum Dunal var. plurifolium Dunal, accepted as Solanum rubetorum Dunal, indigenous
 Solanum didymanthum Dunal var. spinosa C.H.Wright, accepted as Solanum rubetorum Dunal, indigenous
 Solanum dinteri Bitter, accepted as Solanum capense L. 
 Solanum diplocincinnum Dammer, accepted as Solanum tettense Klotzsch 
 Solanum dregei Dunal, accepted as Solanum capense L. 
 Solanum duplosinuatum Klotzsch, accepted as Solanum dasyphyllum Schumach. & Thonn. 
 Solanum elaeagnifolium Cav. not indigenous, naturalised, invasive
 Solanum exasperatum Drege ex Dunal, accepted as Solanum africanum Mill. indigenous
 Solanum galpinii Bitter, accepted as Solanum rubetorum Dunal, indigenous
 Solanum geniculatum Drege ex Dunal, accepted as Solanum africanum Mill. indigenous
 Solanum giftbergense Dunal, accepted as Solanum humile Lam. indigenous
 Solanum giganteum Jacq. indigenous
 Solanum goetzei Dammer, indigenous
 Solanum gracile Dunal, accepted as Solanum chenopodioides Lam. not indigenous
 Solanum guineense L. endemic
 Solanum heterandrum Pursh, accepted as Solanum rostratum Dunal 
 Solanum humile Lam. indigenous
 Solanum incanum L. subsp. horridescens Bitter, accepted as Solanum lichtensteinii Willd. indigenous
 Solanum incanum L. var. lichtensteinii Bitter, accepted as Solanum lichtensteinii Willd. indigenous
 Solanum incanum L. var. subexarmatum (Dunal) Bitter, accepted as Solanum lichtensteinii Willd. indigenous
 Solanum inconstans C.H.Wright, accepted as Solanum terminale Forssk. 
 Solanum indicum L. var. suprastrigulosum Bitter, accepted as Solanum anguivi Lam. indigenous
 Solanum jasminoides Paxton, accepted as Solanum laxum Spreng. not indigenous, naturalised
 Solanum kibweziense Dammer, accepted as Solanum tettense Klotzsch 
 Solanum koniortodes Dammer, accepted as Solanum tettense Klotzsch 
 Solanum kwebense N.E.Br. ex C.H.Wright, accepted as Solanum tettense Klotzsch, indigenous
 Solanum kwebense N.E.Br. ex C.H.Wright var. acutius Bitter, accepted as Solanum tettense Klotzsch 
 Solanum kwebense N.E.Br. ex C.H.Wright var. chondropetalum (Dammer) Bitter, accepted as Solanum tettense Klotzsch 
 Solanum kwebense N.E.Br. ex C.H.Wright var. luederitzii (Schinz) Bitter, accepted as Solanum tettense Klotzsch 
 Solanum kwebense N.E.Br. ex C.H.Wright var. majorifrons Bitter, accepted as Solanum tettense Klotzsch 
 Solanum laciniatum Aiton, not indigenous, cultivated, naturalised, invasive
 Solanum laxum Spreng. not indigenous, naturalised
 Solanum leucophaeum Dunal, accepted as Solanum supinum Dunal, indigenous
 Solanum lichtensteinii Willd. indigenous
 Solanum linnaeanum Hepper & P.-M.L.Jaeger, indigenous
 Solanum litoraneum A.E.GonÃ§. indigenous
 Solanum longipes Dunal, accepted as Solanum africanum Mill. indigenous
 Solanum luederitzii Schinz, accepted as Solanum tettense Klotzsch 
 Solanum lycopersicum L. not indigenous, cultivated, naturalised, invasive
 Solanum lycopersicum L. var. cerasiforme (Alef.) Voss, accepted as Solanum lycopersicum L. not indigenous, cultivated, naturalised, invasive
 Solanum lyratifolium Dammer, accepted as Solanum supinum Dunal 
 Solanum macowanii Fourc. accepted as Solanum capsicoides All. not indigenous
 Solanum macrocarpon L. not indigenous, cultivated
 Solanum mauritianum Scop. not indigenous, naturalised, invasive
 Solanum merkeri Dammer, accepted as Solanum campylacanthum Hochst. ex A.Rich. 
 Solanum miniatum Bernh. ex Willd. accepted as Solanum villosum Mill. subsp. miniatum (Bernh. ex Willd.) Edmonds, not indigenous
 Solanum moestum Dunal, accepted as Solanum rubetorum Dunal, indigenous
 Solanum molle Burm.f. accepted as Solanum tomentosum L. indigenous
 Solanum monotanthum Dammer, accepted as Solanum zanzibarense Vatke 
 Solanum monticolum Dunal, accepted as Solanum guineense L. indigenous
 Solanum multiglandulosum Bitter, accepted as Solanum humile Lam. 
 Solanum multiglandulosum Bitter var. multiarmatum Bitter, accepted as Solanum humile Lam. 
 Solanum namaquense Dammer, accepted as Solanum capense L. indigenous
 Solanum nigrum L. not indigenous, naturalised
 Solanum niveum Vahl, accepted as Solanum giganteum Jacq. indigenous
 Solanum nodiflorum Jacq. accepted as Solanum americanum Mill. not indigenous
 Solanum omahekense Dammer, accepted as Solanum campylacanthum Hochst. ex A.Rich. 
 Solanum omitiomirense Dammer, accepted as Solanum campylacanthum Hochst. ex A.Rich. 
 Solanum panduriforme Drege ex Dunal, accepted as Solanum campylacanthum Hochst. ex A.Rich. indigenous
 Solanum pentheri Gand. accepted as Solanum campylacanthum Hochst. ex A.Rich. indigenous
 Solanum plousianthemum C.H.Wright var. rhodesianum (Dammer) Bitter, accepted as Solanum terminale Forssk. 
 Solanum plousianthemum Dammer, accepted as Solanum terminale Forssk. 
 Solanum pseudocapsicum L. not indigenous, naturalised, invasive
 Solanum pulverulentum L. accepted as Solanum tomentosum L. 
 Solanum quadrangulare Thunb. ex L.f. accepted as Solanum africanum Mill. indigenous
 Solanum quadrangulare Thunb. ex L.f. var. crassifolium (Lam.) Bitter, accepted as Solanum africanum Mill. indigenous
 Solanum quadrangulare Thunb. ex L.f. var. glabrum Dammer, accepted as Solanum africanum Mill. indigenous
 Solanum quadrangulare Thunb. ex L.f. var. integrifolium Dunal, accepted as Solanum africanum Mill. indigenous
 Solanum quadrangulare Thunb. ex L.f. var. sinuato-angulatum Dunal, accepted as Solanum africanum Mill. indigenous
 Solanum rangei Dammer, accepted as Solanum burchellii Dunal 
 Solanum rautanenii Schinz, accepted as Solanum catombelense Peyr. 
 Solanum renschii Vatke, accepted as Solanum tettense Klotzsch, indigenous
 Solanum retroflexum Dunal, indigenous
 Solanum rhodesianum Dammer, accepted as Solanum terminale Forssk. 
 Solanum rigescens Jacq. accepted as Solanum humile Lam. indigenous
 Solanum rigescens Jacq. var. didymanthum (Dunal) Bitter, accepted as Solanum rubetorum Dunal, indigenous
 Solanum rigescens Jacq. var. horridus Bitter, accepted as Solanum rubetorum Dunal, indigenous
 Solanum rigescens Jacq. var. nanum Dunal, accepted as Solanum rubetorum Dunal, indigenous
 Solanum rigescens Jacq. var. parvibaccatum Bitter, accepted as Solanum humile Lam. indigenous
 Solanum rigescens Jacq. var. rubetorum (Dunal) Bitter, accepted as Solanum rubetorum Dunal, indigenous
 Solanum rigescentoides Hutch. accepted as Solanum humile Lam. 
 Solanum rogersii S.Moore, accepted as Solanum sisymbriifolium Lam. not indigenous
 Solanum rostratum Dunal, not indigenous, naturalised
 Solanum rubetorum Dunal, endemic
 Solanum sarrachoides Sendtn. not indigenous, naturalised
 Solanum schaeferi Dammer, accepted as Solanum burchellii Dunal 
 Solanum seaforthianum Andrews, not indigenous, naturalised, invasive
 Solanum seaforthianum Andrews var. disjunctum O.E.Schulz, accepted as Solanum seaforthianum Andrews, not indigenous, naturalised
 Solanum sempervirens Mill. accepted as Solanum guineense L. indigenous
 Solanum sisymbriifolium Lam. not indigenous, naturalised, invasive
 Solanum sodomaeodes Kuntze, indigenous
 Solanum sparsiflorum Dammer, accepted as Solanum catombelense Peyr. 
 Solanum subexarmatum Dunal, accepted as Solanum lichtensteinii Willd. indigenous
 Solanum subrectemunitum Bitter, accepted as Solanum humile Lam. 
 Solanum supinum Dunal, indigenous
 Solanum supinum Dunal var. aranoideum (Dammer) Bitter, accepted as Solanum supinum Dunal 
 Solanum supinum Dunal var. leucophaeum (Dunal) Bitter, accepted as Solanum supinum Dunal, endemic
 Solanum supinum Dunal var. lyratifolium (Dammer) Bitter, accepted as Solanum supinum Dunal 
 Solanum supinum Dunal var. rehobothense Bitter, accepted as Solanum supinum Dunal 
 Solanum tenuiramosum Dammer, accepted as Solanum tettense Klotzsch 
 Solanum terminale Forssk. indigenous
 Solanum terminale Forssk. subsp. inconstans (C.H.Wright) Heine, accepted as Solanum terminale Forssk. 
 Solanum terminale Forssk. subsp. sanaganum (Bitter) Heine, accepted as Solanum terminale Forssk. 
 Solanum tettense Klotzsch, indigenous
 Solanum tettense Klotzsch var. renschii (Vatke) A.E.GonÃ§. accepted as Solanum tettense Klotzsch, indigenous
 Solanum tomentosum L. indigenous
 Solanum tomentosum L. subsp. pauciaculeolatum Bitter, accepted as Solanum rubetorum Dunal, indigenous
 Solanum tomentosum L. var. brevifrons Bitter, accepted as Solanum tomentosum L. indigenous
 Solanum tomentosum L. var. burchellii (Dunal) Wright, accepted as Solanum burchellii Dunal, indigenous
 Solanum tomentosum L. var. coccineum (Jacq.) Willd. accepted as Solanum tomentosum L. endemic
 Solanum tomentosum L. var. integrifolium Flanagan & Bitter, accepted as Solanum tomentosum L. indigenous
 Solanum tomentosum L. var. longiarmatum Bitter, accepted as Solanum tomentosum L. indigenous
 Solanum tomentosum L. var. megalocarpum Bitter, accepted as Solanum tomentosum L. indigenous
 Solanum tomentosum L. var. mollissimum Bitter, accepted as Solanum tomentosum L. indigenous
 Solanum tomentosum L. var. scabriusculum Bitter, accepted as Solanum tomentosum L. indigenous
 Solanum tomentosum L. var. sublyratum Bitter, accepted as Solanum tomentosum L. indigenous
 Solanum torreanum A.E.GonÃ§. indigenous
 Solanum torvum Sw. not indigenous, naturalised
 Solanum triflorum Nutt. not indigenous, naturalised, invasive
 Solanum tuberosum L. not indigenous, naturalised
 Solanum umtuma Voronts. & S.Knapp, endemic
 Solanum upingtoniae Schinz, accepted as Solanum tettense Klotzsch 
 Solanum urosepalum Dammer, accepted as Solanum rubetorum Dunal, indigenous
 Solanum usaramense Dammer, indigenous
 Solanum vagans C.H.Wright, accepted as Solanum zanzibarense Vatke, indigenous
 Solanum viarum Dunal, not indigenous, naturalised
 Solanum villosum Mill. not indigenous, naturalised
 Solanum villosum Mill. subsp. miniatum (Bernh. ex Willd.) Edmonds, not indigenous, naturalised
 Solanum villosum Mill. subsp. villosum, not indigenous, naturalised
 Solanum wilmsii Dammer, accepted as Solanum sodomaeodes Kuntze, indigenous
 Solanum zanzibarense Vatke, indigenous
 Solanum zanzibarense Vatke var. vagans (C.H.Wright) Bitter, accepted as Solanum zanzibarense Vatke, indigenous

Withania
Genus Withania:
 Withania somnifera (L.) Dunal, indigenous

Sphenocleaceae
Family: Sphenocleaceae,

Sphenoclea
Genus Sphenoclea:
 Sphenoclea zeylanica Gaertn. indigenous

References

Biodiversity of South Africa
Solanales